The 19251/19252 Somnath–Okha Express is an Express train belonging to Western Railway zone that runs between  and  in India. It is currently being operated with 19251/19252 train numbers on a daily basis.

Coach composition

The train has standard LHB rakes with a max speed of 130 kmph. But Operating  Max Speed of 110 kmph. The train consists of 21 coaches:
 1 AC 1st Class cum AC II Tier
 1 AC II Tier
 5 AC III Tier
 8 Sleeper coaches
 4 General Unreserved
 2 Seating cum Generator Car

Service

19251/Somnath–Okha Express has an average speed of 45 km/hr and covers 442 km in 9 hrs 25 mins.
19252/Okha–Somnath Express has an average speed of 47 km/hr and covers 442 km in 9 hrs 10 mins.

Route and halts 

The important halts of the train are:

Schedule

Direction reversal

Train reverses its direction 1 times at:

Traction

Both trains are hauled by a Ratlam Loco Shed-based WDM-3A diesel locomotive from Somnath to Okha and vice versa.

References

External links 

 19251/Somnath - Okha Express India Rail Info
 19252/Okha - Somnath Express India Rail Info

Transport in Veraval
Transport in Okha
Express trains in India
Rail transport in Gujarat
Railway services introduced in 2013